Sang Si (also Romanized as Sang Sī) is a village in Lafur Rural District, North Savadkuh County, Mazandaran Province, Iran. At the 2006 census, its population was 77, in 21 families.

References 

Populated places in Savadkuh County